Admiralty is a Mass Transit Railway (MTR) station in Admiralty, Hong Kong. The station's livery is blue and white.

The station and surrounding area are named after HMS Tamar, once the headquarters of the Royal Navy in Hong Kong. It was built on the former site of the naval dockyards, which were built in 1878 and demolished in the 1970s. The Chinese name, which translates to "gold clock", refers to a clock with gold-coloured numerals and hands that was located on the main building of Wellington Barracks from 1890 to 1962.

The  opened in 2016, while the East Rail line platforms opened on 15 May 2022.

History

Development and construction
The government gave the Mass Transit Railway Corporation first refusal on the  site, which was sold to it in 1976 for around HK$200 million for cash and equity consideration.

The Admiralty Centre, United Centre and Queensway Plaza commercial buildings formed part of the development, and sit directly above the station.

At the time, Admiralty and Central stations were the only two MTR stations on Hong Kong Island.

Admiralty was designed to be a transfer station with the then-planned . On 31 May 1985, the first phase of the Island line (between Admiralty and ) opened, with Admiralty the temporary western terminus of the Island line. To facilitate cross-platform interchange, the Tsuen Wan- and Chai Wan-bound platforms were located on a very wide island platform on the lower level, while the Central-bound and termination platforms shared another very wide island platform on the upper level. When the second part of the Island line (Admiralty to ) opened in 1986, the termination platform became the Sheung Wan-bound platform, while the other platforms remained unchanged.

2004 arson attack

The driver decided to complete the journey and passengers were evacuated from the train in Admiralty.

Station expansion and new lines

The South Island line platforms opened on 28 December 2016, after a public open day on 24th of that month, giving residents in the Southern District quicker access to Hong Kong Island's central business district. The opening date was delayed from 2015 due to technical problems in the deep tunnels for the new platforms. The East Rail line began servicing Admiralty on 15 May 2022, allowing commuters from the northeast New Territories to travel directly to Admiralty.

A new single level underground interchange concourse with natural light was built to the east of the original concourse, allowing passengers to transfer to the new lines. The atrium was also expanded. The station expansion, located under Harcourt Garden, incorporates 34 escalators and five lifts to integrate with the existing station. The East Rail line takes up one level under the interchange concourse, with the South Island line being directly below it. Exits E1 and E2 were rebuilt as one exit to accommodate the glass roof of the interchange concourse and has since opened. While the East Rail line tracks will have sidings for terminating trains south of the station, the South Island line tracks end at bumper blocks north of the station with no overrun track.

The narrowest part of the existing platforms on L3 was widened to provide better access to the first and second cars of the Tsuen Wan line trains, as well as last two cars of Island line trains. Island line passengers travelling towards Tsuen Wan now have easier access to these cars. The expansion brought new toilets in the paid area, a lift between the concourse and, ground level, and artwork in the station.

 
The new station has two artworks. The first is Sense of Green by Tony Ip, which is a new bamboo-covered landscaped deck over Harcourt Garden. The second, Urban Soundscape by Otto Li, is located along either side of the escalator shaft between the new and current stations. It depicts passengers' journeys through Admiralty.

Usage and overcrowding

It is also the only interchange station for the South Island line. Despite trains departing at capacity (every 2.1 minutes), commuters frequently have to board the second or even the third train when changing lines. The situation deteriorated following fare cuts following the MTR–KCR merger.

Temporary measures are undertaken during peak hours, including the deployment of additional station assistants, adjustment of escalator directions and making pacifying announcements by local celebrities. During evening peak hours, some Tsuen Wan line trains are taken out of service at Central, and placed back into service at Admiralty, in order to relieve the demand at Admiralty.
In the long term, the existing signalling system of Tsuen Wan line will be upgraded by Thales Transport & Security in 2018. 

Station layout

Admiralty station has a total of six underground floors; the uppermost (L1) floor has the fare control, lobby, shops, Customer Service Centre and other major facilities.

On floor L2, passengers can access Platforms 4 (Tsuen Wan line to Central) and 3 (Island line to Chai Wan). One floor down, on level L3, are Platforms 2 (Island line to ) and 1 (Tsuen Wan line to Tsuen Wan).

There are very wide passageways between the two platforms on each of floors L2 and L3; they are also curved platforms with trains going in opposite directions. The platforms are in the shape of a trapezium. Because all the platforms are curved, there are large stickers in front of the platform screen doors with "Mind the gap" text, which can only be found in this station. Passengers travelling from Eastern District and Wan Chai District can walk across to platform 1 to board the Tsuen Wan line trains bound for Kowloon, Kwai Chung and Tsuen Wan. Passengers travelling from Kowloon, Kwai Chung and Tsuen Wan can walk across and board the Island line trains bound for Chai Wan from platform 3.

Entrances and exits
Admiralty is part of the central business district of Hong Kong Island. There are many office buildings around the station. A major shopping centre, Pacific Place, is accessed through a pedestrian walkway from Exit F.

A: Admiralty Centre 
B: Drake Street, Lippo Centre
C1: Queensway Plaza
C2: Taxi stand
D: United Centre 
E1: Rodney Street 
E2: CITIC Tower 
F: Pacific Place

Transport connections

There is a bus terminus stretching across the length of Admiralty that can be reached from exits B, C2 and D. The terminus is served by buses that connect to many different parts of Hong Kong Island, Kowloon and the New Territories.

Bus routes
Bus
KMB, serving only cross-harbour routes on Hong Kong Island
First Bus
Citybus
Bus terminuses within walking distance of the station:
Admiralty (West) – Exit B
Admiralty (Tamar Street) – Exit B
Admiralty (Drake Street) – Exit C2
Admiralty (East) – Exit D
Admiralty (Rodney Street) – between Exit D

References

Admiralty, Hong Kong
Central, Hong Kong
MTR stations on Hong Kong Island
Tsuen Wan line
Island line (MTR)
East Rail line
South Island line
Railway stations in Hong Kong opened in 1980
Arson in Hong Kong
1980 establishments in Hong Kong